MFK Nová Baňa is a Slovak football team, based in the town of Nová Baňa. The club was founded in 1912.

References

External links 
Official website 
Futbalnet profile 

Football clubs in Slovakia
Association football clubs established in 1912
MFK Nova Bana